{{DISPLAYTITLE:2 41 polytope}}

In 8-dimensional geometry, the 241 is a uniform 8-polytope, constructed within the symmetry of the E8 group.

Its Coxeter symbol is 241, describing its bifurcating Coxeter-Dynkin diagram, with a single ring on the end of the 2-node sequences.

The rectified 241 is constructed by points at the mid-edges of the 241. The birectified 241 is constructed by points at the triangle face centers of the 241, and is the same as the rectified 142.

These polytopes are part of a family of 255 (28 − 1) convex uniform polytopes in 8-dimensions, made of uniform polytope facets, defined by all permutations of rings in this Coxeter-Dynkin diagram: .

The projection of 142 to the E8 Coxeter plane (aka. the Petrie projection) with polytope radius  and 69,120 edges of length  is shown below:

241 polytope 

The 241 is composed of 17,520 facets (240 231 polytopes and 17,280 7-simplices), 144,960 6-faces (6,720 221 polytopes and 138,240 6-simplices), 544,320 5-faces (60,480 211 and 483,840 5-simplices), 1,209,600 4-faces (4-simplices), 1,209,600 cells (tetrahedra), 483,840 faces (triangles), 69,120 edges, and 2160 vertices. Its vertex figure is a 7-demicube.

This polytope is a facet in the uniform tessellation, 251 with Coxeter-Dynkin diagram:

Alternate names 
E. L. Elte named it V2160 (for its 2160 vertices) in his 1912 listing of semiregular polytopes.
It is named 241 by Coxeter for its bifurcating Coxeter-Dynkin diagram, with a single ring on the end of the 2-node sequence.
 Diacositetracont-myriaheptachiliadiacosioctaconta-zetton (Acronym Bay) - 240-17280 facetted polyzetton (Jonathan Bowers)

Coordinates 

The 2160 vertices can be defined as follows:
 16 permutations of (±4,0,0,0,0,0,0,0) of (8-orthoplex)
 1120 permutations of (±2,±2,±2,±2,0,0,0,0) of (trirectified 8-orthoplex)
 1024 permutations of (±3,±1,±1,±1,±1,±1,±1,±1) with an odd number of minus-signs

Construction 
It is created by a Wythoff construction upon a set of 8 hyperplane mirrors in 8-dimensional space.

The facet information can be extracted from its Coxeter-Dynkin diagram: .

Removing the node on the short branch leaves the 7-simplex: . There are 17280 of these facets

Removing the node on the end of the 4-length branch leaves the 231, . There are 240 of these facets. They are centered at the positions of the 240 vertices in the 421 polytope.

The vertex figure is determined by removing the ringed node and ringing the neighboring node. This makes the 7-demicube, 141, .

Seen in a configuration matrix, the element counts can be derived by mirror removal and ratios of Coxeter group orders.

Images 

Petrie polygon projections can be 12, 18, or 30-sided based on the E6, E7, and E8 symmetries. The 2160 vertices are all displayed, but lower symmetry forms have projected positions overlapping, shown as different colored vertices. For comparison, a B6 coxeter group is also shown.

Related polytopes and honeycombs

Rectified 2_41 polytope 

The rectified 241 is a rectification of the 241 polytope, with vertices positioned at the mid-edges of the 241.

Alternate names 
 Rectified Diacositetracont-myriaheptachiliadiacosioctaconta-zetton for rectified 240-17280 facetted polyzetton (known as robay for short)

Construction 
It is created by a Wythoff construction upon a set of 8 hyperplane mirrors in 8-dimensional space, defined by root vectors of the E8 Coxeter group.

The facet information can be extracted from its Coxeter-Dynkin diagram: .

Removing the node on the short branch leaves the rectified 7-simplex: .

Removing the node on the end of the 4-length branch leaves the rectified 231, .

Removing the node on the end of the 2-length branch leaves the 7-demicube, 141.

The vertex figure is determined by removing the ringed node and ringing the neighboring node. This makes the rectified 6-simplex prism, .

Visualizations 

Petrie polygon projections can be 12, 18, or 30-sided based on the E6, E7, and E8 symmetries. The 2160 vertices are all displayed, but lower symmetry forms have projected positions overlapping, shown as different colored vertices. For comparison, a B6 coxeter group is also shown.

See also 
 List of E8 polytopes

Notes

References 
 
 H. S. M. Coxeter, Regular Polytopes, 3rd Edition, Dover New York, 1973
 Kaleidoscopes: Selected Writings of H.S.M. Coxeter, edited by F. Arthur Sherk, Peter McMullen, Anthony C. Thompson, Asia Ivic Weiss, Wiley-Interscience Publication, 1995,  
 (Paper 24) H.S.M. Coxeter, Regular and Semi-Regular Polytopes III, [Math. Zeit. 200 (1988) 3-45]
  x3o3o3o *c3o3o3o3o - bay, o3x3o3o *c3o3o3o3o - robay

8-polytopes